Johan Kemper (1670–1716), formerly Moshe ben Aharon Ha-Kohen of Kraków or Moses Aaron, baptized Johann Christian Jacob;   was a Polish Sabbatean Jew who converted from Judaism to Lutheran Christianity. His conversion was motivated by his studies in Kabbalah and his disappointment following the failure of a prophecy spread by the Polish Sabbatean prophet Zadok of Grodno, which predicted that Sabbatai Zevi would return in the year 1695/6, It is unclear whether he continued to observe Jewish practices after his conversion.

Between 1696 and 1698 he worked for the Hebraist Johann Christoph Wagenseil (1633-1705), for whom he composed a Yiddish Purim play. 

In March 1701 he was employed as a teacher of Rabbinic Hebrew at Uppsala University in Sweden, until his death in 1716. Some scholars believe that he was Emanuel Swedenborg's Hebrew tutor.

During his time at Uppsala, he wrote his three-volume work on the Zohar entitled Likutei ha-Zohar (Compilations from the Zohar, 1710-13). In it, especially its frist part Matteh Moshe (The Staff of Moses, 1710), he attempted to show that the Zohar contained the Christian doctrine of the Trinity.

This belief also drove him to make a literal Hebrew translation of the Gospel of Matthew from Syriac (1703). He also wrote Me'irat 'Enayim (The Enlightenment of the Eyes), (1704) a Christian Cabala commentary on Matthew, which emphasized the unity of the Old and New Testaments and used elements from the Sabbatean and non-Sabbatean Kabbalistic traditions to derive Christian beliefs and meanings from traditional Jewish beliefs and practices.

In his commentary on polemical treatment of Christianity in rabbinical literature he was one of the first Lutherans to comment on the connection between the form of the name "Joshua" used for Jesus in the Talmud, Yeshu, instead of the normal Yeshua used for other figures, and connected the dropping of the final ayin with the ancient curse yimakh shemo.<ref>Mats Eskhult Rabbi Kemper's Case for Christianity in His Matthew Commentary, with Reference to Exegesis (per Mats Eskhult (Uppsala University) Hebrew Studies within Seventeenth Century Swedish Lutheranism) in Religious polemics in context: papers presented to the Second International Conference of the Leiden Institute for the Study of Religions (LISOR)  ed. Theo L. Hettema, Arie van der Kooij - Page 161 2004 - "This is applied to Jesus: "It is easy to see that Jesus is spoken of," Kemper says, "and still today they mock him by rendering his name without 'ayin as Yeshu, ie, 'yimakh shemo ve-zikhro' - may his name and memory be wiped out."</ref>

After his death, Kemper's student Andreas Norrelius (1679–1749) translated the commentary into Latin as Illuminatio oculorum (The Light of the Eyes),(1749).

Works
 Unterthäniger Bericht (1696)
 Eyn Sheyn Purim Shpil (1697)
 Hebrew Translation of Matthew's Gospel (1703)
 Meirat Enayim (1704)
 Likutei ha-Zohar (1710-1713)

Notes

References
Eggerz, Níels P., “Purim in Altdorf: Johann Christoph Wagenseils Interesse am Jiddischen und dessen Kultur sowie seine Zusammenarbeit mit Johann Christian Jakob (Johan Kemper) und jüdischen Konvertiten im Allgemeinen,” in Zeitschrift für Religion- und Geistesgeschichte 71:2 (2019), 148–64.
Eggerz, Níels P., “Zur Verfasserfrage des Altdorfer Purimspiels von 1697,” in Jiddistik Mitteilungen 62 (2019), 21–33.
Eskhult, Josef (ed.), Andreas Norrelius' Latin translation of Johan Kemper's Hebrew commentary on Matthew: edited with introduction and philological commentary by Josef Eskhult Uppsala,2007. 
Eskhult, Mats, “Rabbi Kemper’s Case for Christianity in his Matthew Commentary, with Reference to Exegesis,” in Religious Polemics in Context: Papers Presented to the Second International Conference of the Leiden Institute for the Study of Religions (Lisor) Held at Leiden, 27–28 April, 2000, 148–64. Edited by Theo L. Hettema, Assen: Royal Van Gorcum, 2004. 
Goldish, M. Kottman, K.A. Popkin, R.H. Force, J.E. Laursen, J.C. (eds.), Millenarianism and Messianism in Early Modern European Culture: From Savonarola to the Abbé Grégoire. Springer, 2001. 
Maciejko, P. "Mosheh Ben Aharon Ha-Kohen of Krakow," in Hundert, G.D. (ed.),  The YIVO Encyclopedia of Jews in Eastern Europe,. Yale, 2008. 
Shifra, A. "Another Glance at Sabbatianism, Conversion, and Hebraism in Seventeenth Century Europe: Scrutinizing the Character of Johan Kempper (sic) of Uppsala, or Moshe Son of Aharon of Krakow," in Elior, R. (ed.), The Sabbatian Movement and Its Aftermath: Messianism, Sabbatianism and Frankism,(Hebrew), Hebrew University. Jerusalem.
Wamsley, Rachel, “Characters against Type: Conversion, Mise-En-Page, and Counter-Exegesis in a Seventeenth-Century Purim Play,” in Lias 44 (2017), 59–88.
Wolfson, E. “Messianism in the Christian Kabbalah of Johann Kemper,” in Millenarianism and Messianism in the Early Modern European Culture: Jewish Messianism in the Early Modern World, 139-187. Edited by M. D. Goldish and R. H. Popkin. The Netherlands: Kluwer Academic Publishers, 2001
Wolfson, E. “Angelic Embodiment and the Feminine Representation of Jesus: Reconstructing Carnality in the Christian Kabbalah of Johann Kemper,” in The “Jewish Body” in the Early Modern Period, ''395-426'. Edited by M. Diemling and G. Veltri. Leiden: 	Brill, 2008'''

1670 births
1716 deaths
Christian Hebraists
Christian Kabbalists
Converts to Lutheranism from Judaism
Kabbalists
Writers from Kraków
17th-century Polish Jews
Polish Lutherans
Sabbateans
Academic staff of Uppsala University
Translators of the New Testament into Hebrew
Jewish translators of the Bible
Lutheran biblical scholars